Wesmael is a surname. Notable people with the surname include:

Alfred Wesmael (1832–1905), Belgian botanist
Elisabeth Wesmael (1861–1953), Belgian graphic artist
Constantin Wesmael (1798–1872), Belgian entomologist

Surnames of Belgian origin